Jan Fröhlich (born 15 March 1980) is a male badminton player from the Czech Republic.

Career
He won the men's singles title at the Czech National Badminton Championships ten times from 1998-2006 back to back and in 2012, also in the men's doubles event in 2000, 2001, and 2005. Fröhlich played the 2007 BWF World Championships in men's singles, and was defeated in the first round by Chan Yan Kit, of Hong Kong, 21-15, 21-9. 2005 he won the Kenya International.

Achievements

BWF International Challenge/Series
Men's singles

Men's doubles

Mixed doubles

 BWF International Challenge tournament
 BWF International Series tournament
 BWF Future Series tournament

References

External links

Czech male badminton players
Living people
1980 births
Sportspeople from Mladá Boleslav